Edward Shippen (1639, Methley, West Yorkshire, England – October 2, 1712, Philadelphia, Pennsylvania) was the second mayor of Philadelphia, although under William Penn's charter of 1701, he was considered the first.

Early life 
Edward was born in Methley to his parents, William and Mary, whom were married there on July 16, 1626. Shippen's father was settled in the village of his birth, Monk Fryston, before he migrated to Methley. Monk Fryston is closely linked to the village of Hillam, which was where the Shippen family had hailed from, possibly as early as the thirteenth century according to family tradition.

Political and legal career 
Shippen was appointed to a one-year term by William Penn in 1701. In 1702, he was elected to a second one-year term, making him the first elected mayor of Philadelphia. He was also a leader of the Province of Pennsylvania, and served as Chief Justice of the Supreme Court of Pennsylvania in 1699.  He also served as the chief executive for the Province of Pennsylvania as the President of the Provincial Council between 1703 and 1704.

Shippen first lived in Boston, where, according to family oral history, he was whipped for being a Quaker before being invited by William Penn to move his merchant business to the new city of Philadelphia.

After the sudden death of Deputy Governor Andrew Hamilton in 1703, Shippen, by virtue of being the president of the Provincial Council, became the chief executive of the Province of Pennsylvania.  It was during his term that the Lower Three Counties (modern day Delaware) elected their own Assembly and acted in their own interests.  These counties, however, remained under the Penn Proprietorship and their appointed Deputy Governors until 1776 when Delaware became an independent state.

Personal life
He married Elizabeth Lybrand, a Quaker, in 1671 and became a member of that sect. She died in Boston in 1688. Shippen married, secondly, at Newport, R. I., on September 4, 1689, Rebecca, widow of Francis Richardson, of New York, and daughter of John Howard, of Yorkshire, England. She died in Philadelphia on February 26, 1704, or 1705. He then married at Philadelphia in 1706, Esther, widow of Philip James, and daughter of John Wilcox. She died on August 7, 1724.

Shippen had multiple children with his wives, with many dying at a young age. His children are as follows; Frances (b.1672-d.1673), Edward (b.1674-d.1674), William (b.1675-d.1676), Eliza (b.1676-d.infant), Edward (b.1677-d.1714), Joseph (b.1678-d.1741),  Mary (b.1681-d.1688), Anne (b.1684-d.1712), Elizabeth (b.1691-d.?), John (b.? - d.infant), and William (b. ? - d.1731).

One of Shippen's grandsons was Continental Congressman William Shippen. A granddaughter was the wife of Philadelphia Mayor Charles Willing, whose daughter was Mary Willing Byrd. Another grandson, Edward Shippen III, was also a mayor of Philadelphia. Shippen's great-great-granddaughter was Peggy Shippen, wife of Benedict Arnold.

See also

 List of colonial governors of Pennsylvania
 Philadelphia history and timeline

References

External links

  Biography from Lawmaking and Legislators in Pennsylvania, Vol. One, 1682–1709, pp. 666–669
 Biography at Virtualology.com

1639 births
1712 deaths
People from Cheshire
English emigrants
Colonial American merchants
People of colonial Pennsylvania
People from colonial Boston
Mayors of Philadelphia
Members of the Pennsylvania Provincial Assembly
Members of the Pennsylvania Provincial Council
Edward Shippen